Yevbulyak (Yawbüläk) is a rural locality (a village) and the administrative center of Yevbulyaksky Selsoviet, Askinsky District, Bashkortostan, Russia. The population was 86 as of 2010. There are 2 streets.

Geography 
Yevbulyak is located 13 km southwest of Askino (the district's administrative centre) by road. Korolyovo is the nearest rural locality.

References 

Rural localities in Askinsky District